Polylepis racemosa is a species of small tree in the family Rosaceae. It is endemic to Peru, Bolivia, and Ecuador.  It is threatened by habitat destruction. The International Union for Conservation of Nature has assessed the conservation status of this tree as "vulnerable".

Distribution and habitat
Polylepis racemosa is endemic to high altitudes in the Andes of Peru, Bolivia and Ecuador. South of Lake Titicaca in Bolivia, it is restricted to the region around Araca. The region is known as the "Suni" meaning high and consists of long, narrow, steep-sided valleys and intervening undulating flatter areas.

Ecology
This species is fast growing, and is more ecological and adapts better than other species of the genus. It is a promising candidate for reforestation and agroforestry. This region is cold in the winter but has a dry climate; the herbage consists of various grasses and herbaceous plants, the wild potatoes Solanum acaule and Solanum bukasovii, and the woody shrubs P. racemosa, Mutisia acuminata, Baccharis sp., and Cantua buxifolia, which is the national flower of Peru. In Ecuador it has been introduced from Peru, and this may be detrimental because it hybridises readily with the local species of Polylepis, of which there are eight, including the endemic species Polylepis lanuginosa. The Polyepsis forest plays an important role in the ecosystem of the region, acting as a sponge to retain moisture.

Uses
The Aymara people, the indigenous people of this region, call the tree "queñua" and use the timber for fuel, for roofing their huts and for making charcoal.

Status
Polylepis racemosa has a somewhat restricted range and specific habitat requirements. It is under threat from reduction in its habitat as trees are cut and used for fuel and building materials. The area is also subject to burning, and the International Union for Conservation of Nature has assessed the conservation status of this tree as "vulnerable".

References

racemosa
Flora of the Andes
Páramo flora
Vulnerable plants
Trees of Peru
Trees of Bolivia
Trees of Ecuador
Taxonomy articles created by Polbot